Sallie Ann Keller (born 1956, also published as Sallie Keller–McNulty) is a statistician and a former president of the American Statistical Association (2006).

She is currently a Distinguished Professor in Biocomplexity and director of the Social and Decision Analytics Division within the Biocomplexity Institute at the University of Virginia.  She will also join the United States Census Bureau in October 2022 as Chief Scientist and Associate Director for Research and Methodology, replacing John M. Abowd.

Education and Career
Keller received her Ph.D. in statistics from the Iowa State University of Science and Technology in 1983.    

Prior to her current roles, she served in administrative and academic positions at various universities, such as Virginia Tech, University of Waterloo, Rice University, and Kansas State University. Outside of academia, Keller has also held positions with several federal government institutions, including the Science and Technology Policy Institute, the National Science Foundation, and the Los Alamos National Laboratory.

Academic Service and Honors
Keller is a fellow of the ASA (1997) and the American Association for the Advancement of Science, as well as an elected member of the International Statistical Institute. Most recently, she was elected a member of the National Academy of Engineering in 2020 for development and application of engineering and statistical techniques in support of national security and industry.

Keller has edited Statistical Science, the Journal of Computational and Graphical Studies, and the Journal of the American Statistical Society.

See also
List of presidents of the American Statistical Association
List of fellows of the American Statistical Association

References

External links
 portrait photograph

1956 births
American statisticians
Women statisticians
Iowa State University alumni
Fellows of the American Statistical Association
Presidents of the American Statistical Association
Living people
Mathematicians from Iowa